is a Japanese professional cyclist, who currently rides for UCI Continental team .

After riding with the team as a stagiaire in 2019, Ishigami signed with French UCI ProTeam  in 2020, joining compatriots Fumiyuki Beppu, Atsushi Oka, and Hideto Nakane.

Major results

2014
 7th Road race, Asian Junior Road Championships
2015
 2nd Time trial, National Junior Road Championships
 6th Time trial, Asian Junior Road Championships
2017
 3rd Time trial, National Under–23 Road Championships
2018
 1st  Road race, National Under–23 Road Championships
 1st Oita Urban Classic
 4th Road race, Asian Under–23 Road Championships
2019
 7th Prueba Villafranca-Ordiziako Klasika

References

External links 
 
 

1997 births
Living people
Japanese male cyclists
Sportspeople from Yokohama